Pterygoid notch (incisura pterygoidea) is a notch on the inferior portion of the pterygoid processes of the sphenoid bone, between the medial and lateral plates into which the pyramidal process of the palatine bone is fitted.

Bones of the head and neck